State Route 608 (SR 608) is a north–south state highway in the northeastern portion of the U.S. state of Ohio. The route passes through one of the largest Amish settlements in Ohio; an Amish-run cheese factory is located at Nauvoo Road north of Middlefield.

Route description

History
SR 608 follows part of the Old State Road, which was constructed in 1805 between Painesville and Warren. SR 608 was original commissioned in 1938, between SR 87 and its current northern terminus. The entire route was paved by 1949. The route was extended south to its current southern terminus, at SR 528, in 1965. In that same year SR 44 was rerouted westward, leaving the northern terminus of SR 608 disconnected from the state route system.

Major intersections

References

External links

608
Transportation in Geauga County, Ohio
Transportation in Lake County, Ohio